is a Japanese female volleyball player.

With her club Hisamitsu Springs she competed at the 2015 FIVB Volleyball Women's Club World Championship.

References

1991 births
Living people
Japanese women's volleyball players
Place of birth missing (living people)